Johann Christian Bach (September 5, 1735 – January 1, 1782) was a German composer of the Classical era, the eighteenth child of Johann Sebastian Bach, and the youngest of his eleven sons. After living in Italy for five years, Bach moved to London in 1762, where he became known as "the London Bach". He is also sometimes known as "the English Bach", and during his time spent living in the British capital, he came to be known as John Bach. He is noted for playing a role in influencing the concerto styles of Haydn and Mozart. He contributed significantly to the development of the new sonata principle.

Life
Johann Christian Bach was born to Johann Sebastian and Anna Magdalena Bach in Leipzig, Germany. His distinguished father was already 50 at the time of his birth—an age gap exemplified by the sharp differences in the musical styles of father and son. Even so, father Bach instructed Johann Christian in music until his death in 1750. After his father's death, he worked (and lived) with his second-oldest half brother Carl Philipp Emanuel Bach, who was twenty-one years his senior and considered at the time to be the most musically gifted of Bach's sons.

He enjoyed a promising career, first as a composer then as a performer playing alongside Carl Friedrich Abel, a distinguished  player of the viola da gamba. He composed cantatas, chamber music, keyboard and orchestral works, operas and symphonies.

Bach lived in Italy for many years starting in 1754, studying with Padre Martini in Bologna. He became organist at the Milan cathedral in 1760. During his time in Italy, he converted from Lutheranism to Catholicism and devoted much time to the composition of church music, including music for a Requiem Mass and a Te Deum. Johann also composed a quantity of Latin sacred music during his time in Italy. His first major work was a Mass, which received an excellent performance and acclaim in 1757. In 1762, Bach travelled to London to première three operas at the King's Theatre, including Orione on 19 February 1763. In 1764 or 1765, the castrato Giusto Fernando Tenducci, who became a close friend, created the title role in his opera Adriano in Siria at King's.

That established his reputation in England, and he became music master to Queen Charlotte. In 1766, Bach met soprano Cecilia Grassi, who was eleven years his junior, and married her shortly thereafter. They had no children. J. C. Bach performed symphonies and concertos at the Hanover Square Rooms. This was London's premier concert venue in the heart of fashionable Mayfair. The surrounding Georgian homes offered well-to-do clientele for his performances. One of London's primary literary circles, which included Jane Timbury, Robert Gunnell Esq., Lord Beauchamp, and the Duchess of Buccleuch, was acquainted with Bach, and members were regular attendees at his events.

In 1777, he won a landmark case, Bach v Longman, which established that (in English law) copyright law applied to musical scores.

By the late 1770s, both his popularity and finances were in decline. By the time of Bach's death on New Year's Day 1782, he had become so indebted (in part due to his steward embezzling his money), that Queen Charlotte stepped in to cover the expenses of the estate and provided a life pension for Bach's widow. He was buried in the graveyard of St. Pancras Old Church, London.

Legacy

A full account of J. C. Bach's career is given in the fourth volume of Charles Burney's History of Music.

There are two others named Johann Christian Bach in the Bach family tree, but neither was a composer.

In 1764, Bach met with Wolfgang Amadeus Mozart, who was aged eight at the time and had been brought to London by his father. Bach then spent five months teaching Mozart in composition. Bach is widely regarded as having a strong influence on the young Mozart, with scholars such as Téodor de Wyzewa and Georges de Saint-Foix describing him as "The only true teacher of Mozart". Mozart arranged three sonatas from Bach's Op. 5 into keyboard concertos, and in later life Mozart "often acknowledged the artistic debt he owed" to Johann Christian. Upon hearing of Bach's death in 1782, Mozart commented, "What a loss to the musical world!"

Works

The works of J. C. Bach are given 'W' numbers, from Ernest Warburton's Thematic catalog of his works (New York City: Garland Publishing, 1999). Bach's compositions include eleven operas, as well as chamber music, orchestral music and compositions for keyboard.

References
Notes

Further reading
Hans T. David, A. Mendel, C. Wolff. The New Bach Reader: A Life of Johann Sebastian Bach in Letters and Documents (New York: Norton, 1998).
Heinz Gärtner (trans. by Reinhard Pauly).  John Christian Bach: Mozart's Friend and Mentor. (Portland, Oregon: Amadeus Press, 1994).
Philipp Spitta (trans. by Clara Bell & J. A. Fuller-Maitland). Johann Sebastian Bach, his work and influence on the music of Germany, 1685–1750, 3 vols. (London: Novello & Co., 1899): Vol I, Vol II, Vol III
Charles Sanford Terry. John Christian Bach (London: Oxford University Press, 1967).
Christoph Wolff et al. The New Grove Bach Family. (New York: Norton, 1983) pp. 315ff. .
Percy M. Young. The Bachs: 1500–1850 (London: J. M. Dent & Sons, 1970).

External links

 
J. C. Bach (classical.net)
J. C. Bach (classicalarchives.com)
"Gainsborough and Music" by Brian Robins

1735 births
1782 deaths
German male classical composers
German Classical-period composers
Johann Christian Bach
German opera composers
Male opera composers
Converts to Roman Catholicism from Lutheranism
Catholic liturgical composers
German Roman Catholics
German expatriates in England
Burials at St Pancras Old Church
18th-century classical composers
Pupils of Johann Sebastian Bach
18th-century German composers
18th-century German male musicians
Musicians from Leipzig
People educated at the St. Thomas School, Leipzig